Doki Doki Penguin Land is a series of puzzle platform games developed and published by Sega, and which began in 1985. All games in the series feature a very similar formula whereby players guide an egg to the bottom of  a level by moving or destroying blocks. The egg cannot fall more than a certain distance, nor can it come into contact with an enemy or it will break and the player will lose a life.

Games

Doki Doki Penguin Land
 is  the first title in the series. Originally released in 1985 for the SG-1000 and MSX, it was also among the few games to receive an arcade port running on hardware closely based on the SG-1000. The first game in the series established most of the gameplay conventions of the series.

The game remains the most widely ported, and has been compiled on the Sega Saturn, various cell phones, and a loose adaptation on the Game Boy by Pony Canyon.

Penguin Land

 is a 1985 Master System title, the first game in the series to be released in the West, and thus remains the most well known and popular game in the series in Europe and North America.

The second Penguin Land game departed from the classic story, where father penguin delivers egg to mother penguin, in favor of a more outlandish plot. Overbite, the game's hero, leads an interplanetary mission where he must deliver eggs to his crew in a space station beneath the surface of an unnamed planet. It features much of the same gameplay as the original, but features a level editor, and a few new hazards and block types.

Doki Doki Penguin Land MD
 is the third game in the Penguin Land series. It was initially released in 1991 as a downloadable game for the Sega Mega Drive and later compiled on Game no Kanzume Vol. 2 for the Mega CD. It is more similar to the first game in the series in story, and does not feature a level editor. It is not a remake, however, as the levels, graphics, and music are distinct.

References

Fictional penguins
Puzzle-platform games
Sega video games
Sega Games franchises
Video game franchises
Video games about birds